Pic Macaya National Park is one of two largest national parks of the Republic of Haiti. It is located in the country's southern peninsula, within the Massif de la Hotte. Featuring the country's last stand of virgin cloud forest, it encompasses more than 8,000 hectares. A majority of the park is composed of two tall peaks: Pic Macaya and Pic Formon.

The park was founded in 1984, under the administration of Jean-Claude Duvalier. Originally composed of about 2,000 hectares, the park was expanded to more than 8,000 hectares in March 2013 as part of the Macaya Project. In December 2012, $12 million was pledged through 2017 in agreements with several international development agencies, including the Inter-American Development Bank and the Norwegian Agency for Development Cooperation. The initiative aims to increase protection of the park's natural resources by improving land management. This includes reforesting degraded areas, building infrastructure to reduce erosion from flooding, and enforcing the protection of the park's diverse plant and animal life. One of the biggest challenges to the park is the practice of "charcoal burning," in which large swathes of biomass are burned to produce charcoal, which can be sold at a high price by local inhabitants.

The mountains of the Massif de la Hotte are mainly karstic and volcanic.  The park features endangered plant and animal life, including some endemic to the island of Hispaniola. There are 220 species of birds present in the park, 141 species of orchids, and 367 flowering plants. Six species of frogs, believed to be extinct, have been seen the region in the past several years. Over 6,500 species of plants live at Pic Macaya.

See also 
 List of national parks of Haiti
 Haiti National Trust

External links 
 Parc Macaya by Alliance Haiti

References 

National parks of Haiti
Biota of Hispaniola
Hispaniolan moist forests